is a Japanese football player for Tochigi SC.

Playing career
Nishiya was born in Tochigi Prefecture on October 5, 1993. After graduating from Sendai University, he joined J2 League club Tochigi SC in 2018.

He is the twin brother of Kazuki Nishiya, who currently plays for Tokushima Vortis.

References

External links

1993 births
Living people
Sendai University alumni
Association football people from Tochigi Prefecture
Japanese footballers
J2 League players
Tochigi SC players
Association football midfielders